Isabella of France (1 October 1348 – 11 September 1372) was a French princess and member of the House of Valois, as well as the wife of Gian Galeazzo Visconti, who after her death became Duke of Milan.

Life
Born in Bois de Vincennes, Isabella was the youngest daughter of King John II of France by his first wife, Bonne of Bohemia.

Her maternal uncle Count Amadeus VI of Savoy arranged her marriage with Gian Galeazzo Visconti. As her dowry, Isabella received the county of Sommières, exchanged later for the county of Vertus. On 8 October 1360, Isabella and Gian Galeazzo were married in Milan, and six months later, in April 1361, she was declared sovereign Countess of Vertus. The couple had four children:
Gian Galeazzo, born 1366
Azzone, 1368–1380
Valentina (b. Pavia, 1371 – d. Château de Blois, Loir-et-Cher, 14 December 1408), married on 17 August 1389 to Louis I, Duke of Orléans
Carlo, born 1372.

Only Valentina lived to adulthood; Isabella died giving birth to Carlo in Pavia in 1372 and was buried in the church of San Francesco.

Family tree of Isabella of Vertus

References

Sources

Deaths in childbirth
House of Valois
1348 births
1373 deaths
French princesses
House of Visconti
14th-century French people
14th-century French women
Daughters of kings